Andøy is the northernmost municipality in Nordland county, Norway. It is part of the Vesterålen archipelago. The main island in the municipality is Andøya. The administrative centre of the municipality is the village of Andenes. Other villages in the municipality include Bjørnskinn, Bleik, Dverberg, Fiskenes, Fornes, Nordmela, Risøyhamn, Skarstein, Å, Åknes, and Åse.

The  municipality is the 172nd largest by area out of the 356 municipalities in Norway. Andøy is the 188th most populous municipality in Norway with a population of 4,572.

General information

The municipality of Andøy was established as a new municipality on 1 January 1964 due to the work of the Schei Committee. Andøy Municipality was created from the merger of the old municipalities of Andenes (population: 3,812), Bjørnskinn (population: 1,835), and Dverberg (population: 1,719). Initially, the new Andøy Municipality had 7,366 residents. The municipal boundaries have not changed since that time.

Name
The municipality is named after the island on which it is located, Andøya. The first element is the genitive case of the old uncompounded name of the island  which has an unknown meaning.

Coat of arms
The coat of arms was granted on 7 January 1983. The official blazon is "Azure, a schnecke argent from base sinister to sinister". This means the arms have a field (background) that is divided by a line called a schnecke (a swirling counter-clockwise spiral design that is looks like a wave). The field located below the line has a tincture of argent which means it is commonly colored white, but if it is made out of metal, then silver is used. The tincture above the line is blue. The colors and design of the arms were chosen as a symbol for the fact that the municipality is situated at the sea and that fishing is important economically to the municipality. The arms were designed by Hallvard Trætteberg after an idea of Henry Oddlo Erichsen.

Churches
The Church of Norway has three parishes within the municipality of Andøy. It is part of the Vesterålen prosti (deanery) in the Diocese of Sør-Hålogaland.

Rocket Range
Andøya Space, formerly Andøya Rocket Range, is a civilian rocket range located a few kilometres south of Andenes. As of 2022, construction is in progress for a spaceport capable of launching small satellites. Andøya Space supports research as well as providing educational programming and military work. It also operates another launch site in Ny-Ålesund, Svalbard.

Geography

The municipality of Andøy is spread across the island of Andøya (the northernmost island in the Vesterålen archipelago) and the northeastern part of the island of Hinnøya (the largest and most populous island in Norway). The municipality also consists of smaller skerries including Bleiksøya, Vomma, and Stavaøyan. Andøy is located between the Gavlfjorden and the Andfjorden, and the Risøysundet strait separates the two main islands in Andøy. The Andøy Bridge connects the two islands.

The midsection of the island consists of bogs and marshes, known for their Arctic cloudberries. There are numerous lakes on the island including Bleiksvatnet and Skogvollvatnet. The island is also the only place in continental Norway where coal and fossils from dinosaurs are found. Forfjorddalen nature reserve on Hinnøya has some of the oldest pine trees in Scandinavia, some more than 700 years old.

Birdlife
Lying furthest north in the area known as Vesterålen, Andøy is a mixture of vast areas of marshland fens, with a backdrop of high peaked mountains such as Kvasstinden. The coast is famous for its sheltered bays with white sandy shores. The area has a rich bird life and this is reflected in some good birding localities like Forfjorddalen Nature Reserve and Skogvoll, the latter a Ramsar site of international importance.

The bird cliff at Bleiksøya, outside of Bleik, is a spectacular and photogenic landmark outside the northern part of Andøya, with many species of seabirds including puffin.

Climate
Andøya has a subpolar oceanic climate (Cfc).

Government
All municipalities in Norway, including Andøy, are responsible for primary education (through 10th grade), outpatient health services, senior citizen services, unemployment and other social services, zoning, economic development, and municipal roads. The municipality is governed by a municipal council of elected representatives, which in turn elect a mayor.  The municipality falls under the Vesterålen District Court and the Hålogaland Court of Appeal.

Municipal council
The municipal council of Andøy is made up of 23 representatives that are elected to four year terms. The party breakdown of the council is as follows:

Mayors
The mayors of Andøy:

1964-1964: Anton P. Medby 	
1964–1966: Knut Bolstad
1966–1967: Johan Kleppe (V)
1968–1973: Harold Nicolaisen (H)
1974–1975: Ole Benjaminsen (H)
1976-1979: Johan Kleppe (V)
1980-1995: Leif A. Iversen (H)
1995-1999: Kjell Are Johansen (Ap)
1999-2019: Jonni Helge Solsvik (H)
2019–present: Knut Andreas Nordmo (Sp)

Transportation
The Hurtigruten boat stops at Risøyhamn in Andøy. Andøya Airport at Andenes is served by Widerøe airlines. During the summer, Andenes is connected to Gryllefjord on the island of Senja by ferry. By car, you reach Andøy on Norwegian County Road 82, northbound from Sortland.

Military
Andøya Air Station is located next to Andenes. It is the home of the 333rd Squadron of the Royal Norwegian Air Force and houses all P-3 Orion maritime patrol aircraft in the Norwegian Armed Forces.

Notable people 
 Torbjørn Bratt (ca.1502 in Andenes – 1548) a Norwegian clergyman, the first Bishop of Trondheim
 Helmer Hanssen (1870 in Bjørnskinn – 1956) a Norwegian sailor, pilot and polar explorer; one of the first five explorers to reach the South Pole with Roald Amundsen
 Nanna With (1874 in Andenes – 1965) a Norwegian journalist and voice pedagogue 
 Torstein Raaby (1918 in Dverberg – 1964) a Norwegian telegrapher, resistance fighter and explorer; crew member on the Kon-Tiki expedition
 Finn Myrvang (born 1937 in Bjørnskinn) a Norwegian historian, folklore collector and academic
 Nick Borgen (born 1952 in Andenes) a Norwegian–Swedish musician, singer and writer

References

External links
Municipal fact sheet from Statistics Norway 

 
Municipalities of Nordland
Populated places of Arctic Norway
1964 establishments in Norway